Daniel Gibson is a self-published Canadian author studying the early history of Arabia and Islam. He is the author of Early Islamic Qiblas: A survey of mosques built between 1AH/622 C.E. and 263 AH/876 C.E, which advances the claim that early mosques were oriented towards Petra, rather than towards Mecca or Jerusalem as accepted by mainstream archaeologists and historians of Islam.

Reception and critique
In 2017, historian David A. King authored a highly critical review of Gibson's Early Islamic Qiblas in which he cites plagiarism, misconstruction and misunderstanding of his 1990 work on Qibla direction. King also published a systematic review in 2018 entitled "The Petra fallacy - Early mosques do face the Sacred Kaaba in Mecca but Dan Gibson doesn't know how / Comparing historical orientations with modern directions can lead to false results". 

King argued that early Muslim Arabs were unable to precisely establish Qiblas when building new mosques until later mathematical developments made precision possible. Further, King wrote, many variations in orientation are better accounted for by regional and local practices, imperfect geography, and folk astronomy.  King noted Gibson's inadequate grasp of mathematics, citing Gibson's "spherical polygons" (p. 170) as inexplicable. King summarized his analysis of Gibson's work as an "amateurish, non-scholarly document that is both offensive to Muslims and also an insult to Muslim and Western scholarship." Gibson placed a response to King on academia.edu, "Dr. King on the other hand is convinced that the sloppy qiblas actually intended to point: east, west, solstices, sunrises and so forth. I have not come across anything in Islamic religious manuscripts that support these Qiblas. But perhaps in time someone, somewhere will stumble across something that will change our understanding of Qiblas. All I have found so far, is that every Muslim expects the Qibla to point to Masjid Al Harām."

Walter R. Schumm statistically tested the claims of King and Gibson with his results partially favoring Gibson. However he only used the data provided by Gibson without investigating the methodology of how the data was obtained and noted a discrepancy between website data and book data for Qibla directions.  Under the section on limitations in his study, Schumm admits to having not fully explored King's hypothesis about Qibla direction saying the results would have been too close and instead opting for Gibson's methodology in determining the Qibla direction.

Michael Lecker's review of Gibson's Qur'ānic Geography in the Journal of Semitic Studies from 2014, ends with the sentence: "This book’s imaginative writing may have its followers, perhaps even in academic circles. But the study of early Islamic history is better served by small steps, one at a time."  Historian Daniel C. Waugh wrote a skeptical review in The Silk Road, in which he asks, "One might well ask, is there anything in this rambling, self-published book that is to be taken seriously?" He continues "That said, there is a lot here which might give us pause. He
is certainly not the first to point out the problems in interpreting the relatively few and cryptic references to what we
might term “geography” in the Qur’an or the possible contradictions which arise in trying to establish the factual basis
for information contained in the hadiths and early Islamic
histories, all of which he repeatedly quotes in extenso."

Works 
  Imprint of CanBooks.ca
  Imprint of CanBooks.ca
  Self-published

References

External links 
 Nabataea.net Research page of various researchers on the Nabatean civilization, among them Dan Gibson.
 Documentary film The Sacred City (2016), which presents the contents of Qur'anic Geography.
 Gibson YouTube Channel. which presents Gibson's latest research.

1956 births
Living people
21st-century Canadian historians
Scholars of medieval Islamic history